New Hope Township is a township in Brown County, South Dakota, United States. As of the 2010 census, its population was 96.

References

Townships in Brown County, South Dakota